Vogelsang may refer to:

Places
Vogelsang, Brandenburg, a municipality in the Oder-Spree district, Brandenburg, Germany
, a city part of Ehrenfeld, Cologne, Germany
Vogelsang, Glarus, a hamlet near the village of Elm in the canton of Glarus, Switzerland
Vogelsang, Zehdenick, one of the districts of the city of Zehdenick in Brandenburg, Germany
Vogelsang (Bavarian Forest), a mountain in Germany
Vogelsang Pass, Sierra Nevada, California
Vogelsang Peak, Yosemite National Park, California

People with the surname
Arthur Vogelsang (born 1942), American poet, teacher and editor
Christoph Vogelsang (born 1985), German professional poker player
Clifford J. Vogelsang (1892-1933), American lawyer and businessman
Erika Vogelsang (born 1995), Dutch tennis player
Fritz Vogelsang (born 1932), Swiss athlete who competed in the men's decathlon at the 1960 Summer Olympics
Georg Vogelsang (1883–1952), German actor
Karl Freiherr von Vogelsang (1818-1890), social reformer
Ludwig von Vogelsang, Austrian general of the French Revolution and Napoleonic period
Theo Vogelsang (born 1990), German footballer
Willem Vogelsang (born 1956), deputy director of the International Institute for Asian Studies at the University of Leiden in the Netherlands

See also
Monika Vogelsang, a 1920 German silent historical drama film
Ordensburg Vogelsang, a former Nazi elite school in Germany
Vogelsang Airfield, an abandoned World War II military airfield in Germany
Vogelsang High Sierra Camp, Sierra Nevada, California
Vogelsang Military Training Area, Germany
Vogelsang-Warsin, a municipality in Vorpommern-Greifswald district, Mecklenburg-Vorpommern, Germany